The Living Laser (Arthur Parks) is a supervillain appearing in American comic books published by Marvel Comics. Created by Stan Lee and Don Heck, the character made his first appearance in The Avengers #34 (Nov. 1966). He would become a recurring enemy of Iron Man and plays a key role in the "Iron Man: The Inevitable" miniseries.

Arthur Parks started out as a scientist that invented small, wrist mounted lasers and used them for criminal pursuits. At one point he was a member of the Lethal Legion and at another point he was poised to take over the world due to his possession of the Serpent Crown, but is foiled by the Avengers. At one point it appeared that the Living Laser exploded in space, but in reality his body was transformed into photon form, making him an actual living laser.

Publication history
The Living Laser debuted in The Avengers #34 (Nov. 1966) as Arthur Parks, a scientist who created wrist-mounted laser units and a costume. Writer Mike Conroy notes, "Arthur Parks was a scientist sufficiently proficient to design laser projectors small enough to wear on his wrists, quite the achievement in 1966."

Following his appearance in the following issue, the Living Laser resurfaced in Avengers King-Size Special #1 (Sept. 1967). After an appearance in Captain America #105 (Sept. 1968), the character was part of the first version of the Lethal Legion in The Avengers #78–79 (July–Aug. 1970). The Kree hero Mar-Vell encountered an android version of the Living Laser in Captain Marvel #35 (Nov. 1974). The real Laser reappeared in an extended storyline in  The Avengers #151 (Sept. 1976); #153 (Nov. 1976) & The Avengers Annual #6 (1976).

After appearing as part of a pseudo Lethal Legion in The Avengers #164–166 (Nov. 1977–Jan. 1978), the character returned in Iron Man #152–153 (Nov.–Dec. 1981) and Iron Man #211 (Oct. 1986). The Laser featured in the Acts of Vengeance storyline in Quasar #6 (Jan. 1990) and reappeared in a new photon form in Iron Man #259–263 (Aug.-Dec. 1990) before returning in Quasar #30 (Jan. 1992) and Iron Man #289 (Feb. 1993).

Further appearances included the limited series Super-Villain Team-Up: MODOK's 11 #1–5 (Sept. 2007–Jan. 2008) and The New Avengers #35 (Oct. 2007). The character returned during the limited series Secret Invasion #1–8 (June 2008–Jan. 2009), and made sporadic appearances in The New Avengers.

Fictional character biography
As the "Living Laser", Parks becomes a mercenary and professional criminal. He develops an infatuation with the heroine the Wasp, and after he kidnaps her, he is forced to battle the superhero team the Avengers. He captured Hawkeye and Captain America by placing them in a ring of lasers before leaving, but they were able to contact another member who helped them escape. The Living Laser met the Avengers again when he tried to conquer a small South American country, who defeated and incarcerated the villain.

The Laser, after breaking out of prison by creating a laser using parts teleported to him, reappears as part of a team formed by master villain the Mandarin after being teleported to his base, in an unsuccessful attempt to destroy the Avengers and conquer the world, he attacked Africa to try stealing diamonds, but was defeated by Thor and Hawkeye despite the robot Ultimo being transported there from a volcano. As part of "Batroc's Brigade" (consisting of the Laser; the Swordsman and Batroc the Leaper) he participated in a battle against Captain America. The Laser reappears as part of the first version of the Lethal Legion gathered by the Grim Reaper in a failed revenge plot against the Avengers. There is an encounter between Kree hero Mar-Vell and an android version of the Laser.

The Laser eventually acquires the artifact the Serpent Crown, and while controlling the living weapon Nuklo and a battalion of the US Army attempts to conquer the world, but is defeated by the Avengers. He is then employed, along with fellow villains Power Man and Whirlwind, by Count Nefaria, who temporarily amplifies their abilities and sends them against the Avengers as the second Lethal Legion. The effect, however, is temporary and their combined abilities are drained by Nefaria (who in "powered" mode battles the Avengers until defeated by the Vision).

Discovering that the amplification caused a build-up of energy in his body that is reaching a critical, and potentially fatal, level, the Laser seeks the aid of East German scientists, who offer to help by draining off the excess energy and using it to power a network of weapons satellites. The plan, however, is stopped by Iron Man and in battle with the hero, the Laser's energy levels build to critical mass. Although the Laser begs for help, Iron Man has no choice but to hurl the character into the atmosphere where he detonates and apparently dies. Eventually revived, the Laser battles Iron Man once again; and during the "Acts of Vengeance" storyline battles the hero Quasar.

The Laser reappears in a new photon form, posing as the deceased Titanium Man while taunting Iron Man. The villain is eventually defeated and banished to an alternate universe. He eventually escapes, and mounts a new attack on Stark Industries. James Rhodes—Stark's friend and employee, currently acting as CEO and the new 'Iron Man' while Tony is apparently dead—tricks the Laser by offering him a position at the company before trapping him in a wide-beam communication chamber which disperses him across the Andromeda Galaxy, although Rhodes wonders if he did the right thing and even the Laser privately wondered if he would legitimately accept Rhodes' offer to return to a research role or just take it to destroy the company from within.

The Laser returns as an employee of the A.I.M. member MODOK, and later as a member of the criminal army formed by the villain the Hood. The villain sides with the heroes during the Secret Invasion storyline in a pitched battle with the alien Skrulls, and has a number of encounters with various teams of Avengers.

Mandarin and Zeke Stane recruit Living Laser to join up with other Iron Man villains in a plot to defeat Iron Man. Upon receiving upgrades, Living Laser managed to break Tony Stark's repulsor arc causing him to go into cardiac arrest.

During the "Opening Salvo" part of the "Secret Empire" storyline, Living Laser is recruited by Baron Helmut Zemo to join the Army of Evil. Living Laser, Batroc the Leaper, and Whirlwind attack a haggard, bearded man in torn World War II army uniform who identifies himself as Steve Rogers. He is assisted by people that appear to be Sam Wilson and a Bucky Barnes with both his arms.

During the "Search for Tony Stark" arc, Living Laser rejoined Hood's gang and assisted in the attack on Castle Doom.

In a lead-up to the "Sins Rising" arc, Count Nefaria using a wheelchair later forms his latest incarnation of the Lethal Legion with Grey Gargoyle, Living Laser, and Whirlwind in a plot to target the Catalyst. At Empire State University, Dr. Curt Connors reveals the Catalyst to the crowd when the Lethal Legion attacks. While Grey Gargoyle and Whirlwind attack the people present, Living Laser helps Count Nefaria to operate the Catalyst. Spider-Man shows up and has a hard time fighting them due to the fact that his mind was focused on what a revived Sin-Eater did to Overdrive. Sin-Eater shows up and starts using the same gun he used on Overdrive on the Lethal Legion members while taking their powers. All four of them were sent to Ravencroft where they started to act like model inmates.

As a side-effect of Sin-Eater's suicide upon copying Madame Web's precognition revealed that Kindred was using them, Living Laser and the rest of the Lethal Legion regained their sins and are among the villains that went on a rampage.

During the "Sinister War" storyline, Kindred revived Sin-Eater again and one of the demonic centipedes that emerged from his body took possession of Living Laser making him one of the members of the Sinful Six.

Powers and abilities
A gifted research scientist with expertise in laser technology and a Ph.D in physics, Arthur Parks began his criminal career using wrist-mounted laser projection units, and later implants miniature laser diodes into his skin which absorb energy. With the diode implants, Parks is capable of energy projection, light refraction for invisibility and illusion generation.

Parks's material body is eventually replaced by photons due to an overloading of the diode implants. By increasing the density of the photons comprising his form, Parks can achieve "solidity", project photons as energy beams, and create three-dimensional holographic images. The character also possesses limited telepathic abilities and can travel at light speed.

Other versions

What If?
The alternate universe title What If features a story which the character reforms and works at Stark Industries, with three different outcomes being presented.

Heroes Reborn
In the Heroes Reborn universe, created by Franklin Richards, Arthur Parks was a successful businessman of Parks Fiberoptics, until he lost his company to Tony Stark. Parks, now broken and desperate, having left his wife Amy, used his own technology to transform himself and attack Stark in his own home. Stark learned why Parks was attacking him, and tried to atone for what he had done and convince Parks to stop his attack. Parks refused to stop so Stark in his Iron Man suit was forced to destroy his containment armor causing his laser form to dissipate, killing him.

In other media

Television
 The Living Laser appears in Iron Man, voiced by Robert Hays. This version is a servant of the Mandarin.
 The Living Laser appears in Iron Man: Armored Adventures, voiced by Louis Chirillo. This version is a former Maggia grunt who obtains an untested Stark International prototype teleportation vest that transforms him into the unstable Living Laser. He goes on a rampage until Iron Man defeats him. After Parks is remanded to S.H.I.E.L.D.'s custody, the Ghost frees him under A.I.M.'s orders. However, Parks reforms upon learning Tony Stark and Iron Man are the same person and that he was only trying to help. Parks sacrifices himself to stop MODOK, but is later revived by Mr. Fix and Justin Hammer as two separate versions of himself, one positively charged and the other negative. Eventually, with Iron Man's help, Parks succeeds in reconstituting himself and thanks Iron Man before leaving to explore the universe.
 The Living Laser appears in The Avengers: Earth's Mightiest Heroes, voiced by Nolan North. Introduced as an inmate of the Vault in the episode "Breakout, Part 1", he attempts to raid the prison's evidence room to reclaim his weaponry amidst a mass breakout, only to be foiled by Hawkeye. As of the episode "This Hostage Earth", the Living Laser became a member of the Masters of Evil. The former fights Iron Man, but gets shot into outer space. In the episode "Acts of Vengeance," the Avengers find the Living Laser trapped in light form following an encounter with the Enchantress and incarcerate him in Prison 42.
 The Living Laser appears in the Ultimate Spider-Man episode "Flight of the Iron Spider", voiced by Keith Szarabajka. This version is a former Stark Industries employee. Spider-Man and his fellow S.H.I.E.L.D. trainees fight the Living Laser until Iron Man drives him off, though the Living Laser secretly hacks Spider-Man's suit. The Living Laser later takes over most of Iron Man's suits in a bid to hack into Stark Industries' technology, but Spider-Man and his team drive him out and into a molecular disruption chamber that scatters the Living Laser across the multiverse, with one aspect ending up in the Super Hero Squad's universe, where he is defeated by that universe's Thor.

Video games
 The Living Laser appears in Captain America and the Avengers.
 The Living Laser appears as a boss in Iron Man 3: The Official Game, voiced by Tom Wayland. This version is a mutation created by A.I.M., Aldrich Killian / MODOK, and Ezekiel Stane. The Living Laser fights Iron Man on two occasions, with the former succeeding in securing Extremis for A.I.M. during their first encounter. Later on, the Living Laser assists MODOK in uploading his consciousness into the Stark Industries mainframe and leads Iron Man to China as a diversion so Stane can capture Pepper Potts. After being defeated by Iron Man, the Living Laser vanishes.
 The Living Laser appears as a boss in Marvel Heroes, voiced by Andrew Kishino.
 The Living Laser appears in Marvel: Avengers Alliance 2.
 The Living Laser appears as a boss in Iron Man VR, voiced by Leonardo Nam. This version is a former Stark Industries employee with a personal vendetta against Tony Stark. After dying under unknown circumstances, he is resurrected by the Ghost, who provides him with laser armor technology to help her carry out her own revenge against Stark. Calling himself the "Living Laser", he battles Iron Man several times before he is defeated and arrested during an attack on the S.H.I.E.L.D. Helicarrier.

References

External links
 Living Laser at the Marvel Directory
 
 

Characters created by Don Heck
Characters created by Stan Lee
Comics characters introduced in 1966
Fictional characters who can manipulate light
Fictional mercenaries in comics
Marvel Comics scientists
Marvel Comics supervillains